Dmitry Nikolayevich Patrushev (born 13 October 1977) is a Russian banker and politician serving as the Minister of Agriculture of Russia since 18 May 2018. 

Dmitry Patrushev is the son of Nikolai Patrushev, former Director of FSB and current Secretary of the Russian Security Council.

Following the publication of the Navalny 35 list of Russian human rights abusers and the 2022 Russian invasion of Ukraine, sanctions were imposed against Patrushev by Australia, Canada, and the United Kingdom.

Biography
Dmitry Patrushev was born in Leningrad on 13 October 1977.

Education 
In 1999, he graduated from the State University of Management with a degree in Management.

From 2002 to 2004, he studied at the Diplomatic Academy in the specialty "World Economy".

In 2006, he graduated from the FSB Academy.

Scientific activity 
On April 16, 2003, Patrushev defended his PhD dissertation on organizational and economic foundations of quality management in research organizations at the Saint Petersburg State University of Economics and Finance under G. N. Ivanova's supervision. The official referents for the defense were B. V. Pryankov and P. M. Shavkunov.

On July 3, 2008, he defended his Doctor of Sciences (DSc) dissertation in Economics at the Saint Petersburg State University of Economics and Finance. The dissertation entitled "State and market regulators in the formation and implementation of industrial policy: The case of natural monopolies of the Fuel-Energy Complex" was defended under the supervision of V. V. Korelin; the official referents were V. V. Glukhov, A. V. Kruglov and S. A. Uvarov.

Career 
From 1999 to 2002, he worked in the Ministry of Transport.

In 2004, he joined VTB Bank.

Since 2007, he has held the position of senior Vice President of VTB Bank.

From 2010 to 2018, he was Chairman of the Board and member of the Supervisory Board of the Russian Agricultural Bank. During Patrushev's chairmanship, the bank extended the variety of products and services offered to individuals and businesses. New insurance and investment business lines were established, and the bank increased its support for the agro-industrial complex. Moreover, from 2010 to 2017, Russian Agricultural Bank's loan portfolio qudripled. In 2017, its amount was estimated to be 2.97 trillion rubles.

From 2016 to 2021, he was a member of the Gazprom Board of Directors.

Minister of Agriculture 
On 18 May 2018, he was appointed Minister of Agriculture. On 21 January 2020, he was re-appointed for this post in Mikhail Mishustin's Cabinet. Under the direction of Patrushev, the state program "Integrated Development of Rural Areas" was implemented. By the end of 2020, it covered 82 regions of the Russian Federation and affected 6 million people.

Corporate management 
Since 2016, Patrushev has been a member of PJSC Gazprom's Board of Directors.

Since 2018, he has served as Chairman of the Supervisory Board of Russian Agricultural Bank JSC.

Family 
Patrushev is unmarried. He has six children: three sons and three daughters.

His father, Nikolay Platonovich Patrushev, is a Russian statesman. He held the post of Director of the Federal Security Service of Russia from 1999 to 2008. On May 12, 2008, he was appointed Secretary of the Security Council of the Russian Federation.

His mother, Elena Nikolaevna Patrusheva (born 1955), worked as a doctor of ultrasound diagnostics and was an employee of Vnesheconombank. In 1993, together with Boris Gryzlov and other classmates and coworkers of her husband, she became a founder of Borg LLP, which specialized in exporting scrap metal.

Patrushev has a brother, Andrey, known as the former Deputy General Director for offshore project development at Gazprom Neft and former General Director of Gazprom Neft Shelf. As of 2021, Andrey Patrushev has been working as Director General of the Arctic Initiatives Center.

Awards
Order of Honour (October 26, 2016) - for contributing to the organization of credit support of the agro-industrial complex
Medal "For Services to the Chechen Republic" (December 26, 2017)
Honored Worker of Agriculture of the Chechen Republic (April 15, 2022)
Certificate of Merit of the Ministry of Agriculture of the Russian Federation - for continuous and conscientious work in the agricultural sector
Diploma of the Association of Russian Banks - for contributing to the development of the Russian banking system
Industry Award "Banker of the Year" (2015)

References

Patrushev
Patrushev
Patrushev
Patrushev
Patrushev
Patrushev
State University of Management alumni
Politicians from Saint Petersburg